ALM Antillean Airlines Flight 980 was a flight scheduled to fly from John F. Kennedy International Airport in New York City to Princess Juliana International Airport in St. Maarten, Netherlands Antilles, on 2 May 1970. The accident is one of a small number of intentional water ditchings of jet airliners.

Aircraft and crew 
The aircraft was a twin-engine Douglas DC-9-33CF, operated on behalf of ALM Antillean Airlines by Overseas National Airways (ONA), with an ONA aircraft and flight crew, and an ALM cabin crew. It was registered in the United States with FAA tail number  The flight carried 57 passengers and 6 crew. The flight crew consisted of Captain Balsey DeWitt (37), First Officer Harry Evans II (25), and Navigator Hugh Hart (35).

Flight and ditching 
Flight 980 made a normal departure from Kennedy Airport, and had an uneventful flight to the Caribbean. The captain elected to divert to San Juan, but shortly thereafter, the tower at St. Maarten advised them that the weather had improved sufficiently for landing. The flight made an initial approach to St. Maarten, but failed to see the runway in time to line up for landing, and announced a missed approach.

Flight 980 then made a second landing attempt, but it, too, was unsuccessful because of alignment with the runway. After breaking off that approach, the crew made a third attempt, but the aircraft was too high to land safely. After assessing the weather and fuel situation, the crew elected to divert to St. Croix, and received a vector and clearance. At this point, the crew noticed a possible discrepancy between the fuel gauges and what had been computed as the amount of fuel remaining. The captain advised ATC of his intention to ditch the aircraft, and began a low approach over the water. Flight 980 ditched in the Caribbean Sea at 3:49 PM local time, 30 miles east of St. Croix.

Although the pilots flashed the seat belt signs just prior to ditching, confusion remained in the cabin as to when or whether the plane was to touch down. The public address system was not working on the plane, so the cabin were not given any warning of the impending ditching. Consequently, an unknown number of passengers and crew were either standing up, or had their seat belts unfastened, when the aircraft struck the water.

The sea was rough at the time as a result of the weather conditions. The accident resulted in 23 fatalities, as well as injuries to 37 of the 40 survivors. Both pilots and the navigator survived. The survivors were left bobbing in the turbulent and shark-inhabited sea in their life jackets until rescue came. Recovery of the survivors by helicopter began approximately  hours after the ditching, and the last survivor, the first officer, was picked up about 1 hour later. The helicopters were guided to the rescue site by a Pan American Airways plane, whose pilot reported the ditching by radio, then circled the scene until help came to help guide rescuers.

Rescue efforts included units from the U.S. Coast Guard, U.S. Navy, and U.S. Marine Corps, and a number of survivors were rescued by helicopter.

Investigation and aftermath 
The accident was investigated by the U.S. National Transportation Safety Board (NTSB). The report concluded that the cause of the accident was poor fuel management, complicated by the crew's inattention and distraction as a result of the weather situation and multiple diversions. Some specific issues cited include miscalculation of the rate of fuel consumption, misreading fuel gauges, and incorrect computation of the amount of fuel expected to be remaining at the time of landing.  The NTSB report stated:

The NTSB also concluded that the chances of survival in the accident were worsened by poor coordination among the crew before and during the ditching.

The recommendations in the report included adding "warn passengers" to the checklist of procedures for emergency landings and ditchings, requiring that flights not be dispatched without a working public address system, and phasing out an older type of seat belt then in use in favor of more modern designs.

DeWitt was fired six months after the incident; he never piloted a plane again.

In popular culture 

The ditching of Flight 980 is featured in the first season 1 episode of The Weather Channel documentary Why Planes Crash. The episode is titled "Brace for Impact", and was aired in July 2009. It featured an interview with Captain Balsey DeWitt.

See also 

 List of accidents and incidents involving commercial aircraft
 List of airline flights that required gliding

References

External links

Airliner accidents and incidents caused by fuel exhaustion
Aviation accidents and incidents in 1970
Airliner accidents and incidents in the United States Virgin Islands
Airliner accidents and incidents involving ditching
Accidents and incidents involving the McDonnell Douglas DC-9
ALM Antillean Airlines accidents and incidents
1970 in the United States Virgin Islands
Aviation accidents and incidents in the United States in 1970
May 1970 events in North America